A pirulín (also known as pirulí) is a multicolor, conic-shaped hard candy of about 10 to 15 cm long, with a sharp conical or pyramidal point, with a stick in the base, and wrapped in cellophane. 

In Argentina, Colombia, and Cuba, this candy used to be very popular and sold in the streets and squares by the pirulineros, who can be considered a kind of peddlers specializing in this kind of candy. However, nowadays it is most commonly found in certain supermarkets specializing in sweets and also in a few "kioscos".

Other names for pirulín:
 Bolivia: pirulo.
 Chile: pico dulce.
 Guatemala: chupete.
 Mexico: pirulí or chupirul (the latter name is a result of the success of the trademark used by Luxus).

See also
Lollipop
Chupa Chups, Spanish confectionery brand
Torrespaña, a television tower nicknamed "Pirulí" in Madrid, Spain.
Víctor Yturbe, a Mexican singer, nicknamed "El Pirulí".

Candy